Discoplax is a genus of terrestrial crabs. It is very closely related to the genus Cardisoma.

Five species are currently recognised:

Discoplax celeste 2012
Discoplax gracilipes Ng & Guinot, 2001
Discoplax longipes A. Milne-Edwards, 1867
Discoplax magna Ng & Shih, 2014
Discoplax michalis Ng & Shih, 2015
Discoplax rotunda (Quoy & Gaimard, 1824)

See also 
 Tuerkayana – a genus which holds crabs formerly found in Discoplax and Cardisoma

References

Grapsoidea
Terrestrial crustaceans